David Burnham (March 2, 1907 – 1974), was an American novelist.

Burnham was born in Chicago, Illinois.

He was the son of Claude George Burnham, an English immigrant who was executive for the Burlington Railroad, and Mary Burnham (nee Gillis) from Minnesota. His younger brother was James Burnham (1905–1987), philosopher and political theorist.

Publications
This Our Exile (New York: C. Scribners, 1931. London: P. Davies, 1931), dust jacket designed by Cleonike (Cleo Damianakes)
Wedding Song (New York: Viking Press, 1934. London: Peter Davies, 1934)
Winter in the Sun (New York: C. Scribners, 1937)
Last Act in Bermuda (New York: C. Scribners, 1940)

References

1907 births
1974 deaths
20th-century American novelists
Novelists from Illinois
American male novelists